Calliandra surinamensis is a low branching evergreen tropical shrub that is named after Suriname, a country in northern South America. The plant usually has complexly branched multiple trunks and grows to a height of about 5 metres, although many sources suggest that it only attains a height of 3 metres. Left unpruned it grows long thin branches that eventually droop down onto the ground. The leaves close and droop from dusk until morning when they once again reopen. Calliandra surinamensis is said to contain lectins which are toxic to cancer cells, although more research is needed. Calliandra surinamensis contains three important compounds: myrectin which contains antioxidant and anti-inflammatory properties, lupeol which contains anti-inflammatory and anti-cancer properties, and ferulic acid which contains antimicrobial properties.

Description

Leaves
The leaves are bipinnate. Each pair of leaflets, or pinnae, are in turn divided into about six pairs of leaflets, pinnules.

Flowers
The flowers present as globose heads with small green petals and calyx with up to a 100 stamens more or less united into a tube. The stamens are long, hairlike, colourful and protrude well beyond the petals. C. surinamensis flowers all year round with definite more prolific periods. The flowers are short lived and sticky and combined with their quantity give this plant a reputation for making a mess especially on vehicles parked under it.

Stamens
The numerous colourful stamens are white towards the base and pink towards the top. It is the stamens & anthers that give the flower the appearance of a pink powder puff.

Fruit
The fruit is a 4 centimetres (1.5 in) long pod´

Ecology
The shrub's year round nectar and pollen attracts wildlife such as lorikeets and fruit bats.

Common names
Pink powder puff, Pompon De Marin, Surinam powderpuff,  Surinamese stickpea

Gallery

References

surinamensis
Flora of South America
Taxa named by George Bentham